The Scout and Guide movement in Liberia is served by two organisations (one for boys and one for girls)
 Liberian Girl Guides Association, member of the World Association of Girl Guides and Girl Scouts
 Boy Scouts of Liberia, member of the World Organization of the Scout Movement

See also